Mindy Chen-Wishart is a Professor of the Law of Contract and Dean of the Faculty of Law, University of Oxford, and Fellow and Tutor in Law at Merton College, Oxford. She is author of numerous articles on contract law and the law of obligations, and her scholarship has been adopted in courts around the world, including the Canadian Supreme Court and the England and Wales Court of Appeal.

Born in Taiwan, she was brought up in New Zealand. She began her academic career at the University of Otago, where she completed a Master's degree in 1987, before moving to Oxford, initially as a research fellow funded by the Rhodes Trust.

In 2021, she called for anti-racism training across Oxford University, citing her personal experiences. She also launched the #RaceMeToo Twitter campaign to highlight racism faced by BAME academics. She was also signatory of a number of open letters: by legal academics in support of academic freedom, by international lawyers urging the European Union to respect international law and the human rights of refugees, and by Oxford and Cambridge academics protesting the UK government's changes to funding for higher education.

Publications
Unconscionable Bargains (Butterworths 1989) 
Contract Law (OUP, 1st edn 2005, 6th edn 2018)

References

External links

Fellows of Merton College, Oxford
Legal scholars of the University of Oxford
Year of birth missing (living people)
Living people